Giorgos Kyrgias (born 10 April 1960) is a Greek football manager and former player, who holds the record for the longest-serving coach in Greek football. He has managed fifth-division club Diogenis Larissa since 1987. His 35-year tenure is also one of the highest ever wordwide.

Biography
Kyrgias started his career from the youth section of AE Larissa as a forward in the early 1970s and later played for various teams in the amateur divisions of the Larissa FCA and also in regional leagues of Australia. He took over Diogenis in 1987 attracting ever since many well-known players usually during the later stages of their careers such as  Greek champions with Panathinaikos Nikos Patsiavouras and Dimitris Tsapatoris, Thomas Koutsianikoulis, former AE Larissa players Nikos Vlachoulis, Thanasis Ntelopoulos, Nikos Nanoulis, Triantafyllos Mangos and former Apollon Larissa players Nikos Zisakis and Michalis Bizios.He currently coaches Diogenis with experienced Nikos Vlachoulis as his assistant, a manager who had been at the helm of Iraklis Larissa, AO Trikala, AE Larissa, and Apollon Larissa in the past. The 2022–23 season is his 36th consecutive with the club.

Personal life
Giorgos Kyrgias is brother to taekwondo grandmaster of 9 Dans, legendary Greek-Australian Chris Kyrgias who passed away on 16 June 2019 at the age of 67, in a motorbike accident in Macedonia, Greece.

References

1960 births
Living people
Greek football managers
Footballers from Larissa